B2, B02, B.II, B.2 or B-2 may refer to:

Transportation

Aircraft
 AEG B.II, a German aircraft during World War I
 Albatros B.II, a 1914 unarmed German two-seat reconnaissance biplane
 Aviatik B.II, a 1915 German reconnaissance aircraft 
 Blackburn B-2, a British biplane side-by-side trainer aircraft 
 Brantly B-2, a helicopter
 Curtiss B-2 Condor, an American biplane bomber built before World War II
 DFW B.II, a 1914 German aircraft
 Euler B.II, a German Idflieg B-class designation aircraft
 Farman B.2, a French Farman aircraft
 Flanders B.2, a 1912 British experimental biplane 
 Fokker B.II (1916), two different German unarmed observation aircraft of World War I
 Fokker B.II (1923), a 1923 Dutch reconnaissance flying boat
 Halberstadt B.II, a German Idflieg B-class designation aircraft
 Lohner B.II
 LVG B.II, a 1910s German two-seat reconnaissance biplane 
 Northrop Grumman B-2 Spirit, an American stealth bomber of the United States Air Force
 Avro Vulcan B2, the Mark 2 version of a Royal Air Force V-Bomber aircraft
 Any Mark 2 bomber aircraft under the British military aircraft designation systems

Locomotives
 Alsace-Lorraine B 2, an Alsace-Lorraine P 1 class steam locomotive
 Bavarian B II, an 1851 German steam locomotive model
 GS&WR Class B2, a Great Southern and Western Railway Irish steam locomotive
 LB&SCR B2 class, a British LB&SCR locomotive class
 GCR Class 1, classified B2 during ownership, reclassified B19 in 1945
 LNER Thompson Class B2, a British class of 4-6-0 steam locomotives rebuilt from B17s
 NCC Class B2, a Northern Counties Committee Irish steam locomotive

Submarines 
 , an American B-class submarine of the US Navy
 , one of eleven British B class submarines of the Royal Navy

Roads

Other transport
 B2 (New York City bus) serving Brooklyn
Belavia Belarusian Airlines (IATA airline designator code B2)
 B2 (İstanbul), a commuter line in İstanbul, also known as the Sirkeci-Halkalı line
 Marussia B2, a high-performance luxury sports coupé built by Russian automaker Marussia Motors
Guangzhou Metro CSR-Zhuzhou Class B EMU, internal callsign B2 for the first batch

Computing 
 b2/cafelog, the precursor to the WordPress blogging software
 B2evolution, a multi-lingual, multi-user, multi-blog publishing system forked from b2/cafelog
 B2, a subclass of security level B as defined by Trusted Computer System Evaluation Criteria (TCSEC) standards
 B2, a cloud-based object storage service provided by Backblaze

People and characters 
 B2, the name of a character from the Dutch television series Bassie en Adriaan
 B-2 or B² (B squared), the stage name used by wrestler Barry Buchanan
 B2, one of a pair of bananas featured in the children's television show Bananas in Pyjamas

Visas 

 South Korea B-2 visa, a tourist or transit visa granted by South Korea
 United States B-2 visa, a non-immigrant visa granted by the United States of America

Biology 
 ATC code B02 Antihemorrhagics, a subgroup of the Anatomical Therapeutic Chemical Classification System
 Bradykinin receptor B2, a human gene
 Proanthocyanidin B2, a B type proanthocyanidin
 Thromboxane B2, an inactive metabolite/product of thromboxane A2
 Vitamin B2

Other 
 B2, a postcode area in central Birmingham
 B2 basketball league (Albania); see Albanian Basketball League
 B2, an international standard paper size defined in ISO 216 measuring 500 mm × 707 mm
 B2, a level in the Common European Framework of Reference for Languages
 B2, a code used by the land use planning system in the UK
 B2 star, a subclass of bluish-white B-class stars
 B02, Alekhine's Defence chess code
 B2 dye, also known as dyesol
B2 (classification), a Paralympic disability classification
 Bi-2, a Russian rock band
 B2 intermetallic compound with equal numbers of atoms of two metals
 B2, an advanced model of battle droid in the Star Wars franchise
 B2, a brand of Canadian retailer Browns Shoes

See also

 
 
 
 
 
 BII (disambiguation)
 BTO (disambiguation)